Pavoclinus profundus, the Deepwater klipfish, is a species of clinid found from Knysna to Algoa Bay along the South African coast where it can be found at depths of from .  It can reach a maximum length of  TL.

References

profundus
Taxa named by J. L. B. Smith
Fish described in 1961